The lamina lucida is a component of the basement membrane which is found between the epithelium and underlying connective tissue (e.g., epidermis and dermis of the skin).  It is a roughly 40 nanometre wide electron-lucent zone between the plasma membrane of the basal cells and the (electron-dense) lamina densa of the basement membrane.

Similarly, electron-lucent and electron-dense zones can be seen between enamel of teeth and the junctional epithelium.  The electron-lucent zone is adjacent to the cells of the junctional epithelium and might be considered a continuation of the lamina lucida as both are seen to harbour hemidesmosomes.  However, unlike the lamina densa, the electron-dense zone adjacent to enamel show no signs of hemidesmosomes.

Some theorize that the lamina lucida is an artifact created when preparing the tissue, and that the lamina lucida is therefore equal to the lamina densa in vivo.

See also
Basal lamina
 List of target antigens in pemphigoid

References

Skin anatomy